Mary LaRoche (also often credited Mary La Roche; July 20, 1920 – February 9, 1999) was an American actress and singer best known for her roles in the feature films Gidget (1959) and Bye Bye Birdie (1963) and for her performances as a guest star and supporting character on American television series between the early 1950s and mid-1970s, including on such popular series as  The Twilight Zone, Alfred Hitchcock Presents, Perry Mason, and Gunsmoke.

Early years
Born in Rochester, New York in 1920, Mary was the youngest of three daughters of Catherine R. (née Carney) and William P. La Roche. Her mother was of Irish descent, although she too had been born in New York. Her father, a native of Canada, supported the family working as the manager of a local hotel and later as the proprietor of a restaurant in Rochester. Mary received training in piano and voice at the Eastman School of Music in Rochester and by age 10 she was already acting on radio programs. She gained additional acting experience in Rochester with the Community Players and the Paddy Hill Players. In 1939, La Roche (later LaRoche) was a sectional winner in the radio talent-show competition Gateway to Hollywood.

Career

LaRoche began singing and acting on and off Broadway in 1938. Over the next seven years she appeared in a number of Broadway musical comedies, including the 1942 operetta The Merry Widow by Franz Lehár. She later was cast in various feature films during the 1950s and 1960s, including in the role of a singer in Catskills Honeymoon in 1950; Operation Mad Ball in 1957; Clark Gable's love interest in 1958's Run Silent, Run Deep; The Lineup, also released in 1958; Gidget in 1959, in which she portrays the mother of Sandra Dee's title character; The Ladies Man in 1961; Bye Bye Birdie in 1963, playing the part of Ann Margaret's mother; and The Swinger in 1966.

LaRoche was very active too in television, usually in guest appearances in single episodes of a television series. She began performing on television as early as 1946, when she was part of a two-person skit that was broadcast on WBKB-TV in Chicago. Then, between 1951 and 1977, she appeared in at least 37 different television series, including five appearances on Perry Mason, two episodes of The Twilight Zone and an episode of The Streets of San Francisco in 1976. One of LaRoche's more complex and dramatic characterizations on television is in the one-hour 1963 episode of Gunsmoke titled "Quint-Cident". In that episode of the classic Western, in a central role opposite Burt Reynolds, she portrays a beleaguered and mentally exhausted widow trying to survive alone on an isolated farmstead in Kansas during the late 1870s.

Personal life
LaRoche was married to actor John Hudson and to actor-producer Sherwood Price.

Theater

On Broadway 
 The Girl from Wyoming (1938–1939), musical comedy, as one of the Cow-Belles.
 The Merry Widow (1942), operetta, music by Franz Lehár, original book by Victor Léon and Leo Stein, adaptation by Adrian Ross : as a singer
 The New Moon (1942), musical comedy, music by Sigmund Romberg, as the nightclub singer
 Laffing Room Only (1944–1945), music and lyrics by Burton Lane, as Sonya, the nightclub singer

International 
 South Pacific performed in Australia (1953), as Nellie Forbush

Select filmography

Cinema 
 Catskill Honeymoon (1950) - the nightclub singer 
 Operation Mad Ball (1957) - Lieutenant Schmidt (uncredited)
 Run Silent, Run Deep (1958) - Laura Richardson
 The Lineup (1958) - Dorothy Bradshaw
 Gidget (1959) - Mrs. Dorothy Lawrence
 The Ladies Man (1961) - Miss Society
 Bye Bye Birdie (1963) - Doris McAfee
 The Swinger (1966) - Mrs. Olsson

Television

Series 
 1958 to 1963: Perry Mason (the original series)
 Season 1, episode 31 "The Case of the Fiery Fingers" (1958), as Vicky Braxton
 Season 2, episode 18 "The Case of the Jaded Joker" (1959), as Lisa Hiller
 Season 3, episode 1 "The Case of the Spurious Sister" (1959), as Grace Norwood
 Season 5, episode 6 "The Case of the Meddling Medium" (1961), as Helen Garden
 Season 6, episode 14 "The Case of the Bluffing Blast" (1963), as Donella Lambert
 1959: Yancy Derringer 
 Season 1, episode 14 “Nightmare on Bourbon Street”, as Barbara Kent
 1959: Mickey Spillane's Mike Hammer (the original series)
 Season 4, episode 14 Tales of Wells Fargo "Long Odds" (1959), as Lorna Terret 
 Season 2, episode 37 "Slab Happy", as Julie Gates
 1960 to 1963: The Twilight Zone
 Season 1, episode 36 "A World of His Own" (1960), as Mary 
 Season 5, episode 6 "Living Doll" (1963), as Annabelle Streator
 1962: Checkmate
 Season 2, episode 17 "Death Beyond Recall", as Martha Baker
 1962: Wagon Train
 Season 5, episode 31 "The Jud Steele Story", as Ursula Steele
 1962 to 1963: Dr. Kildare
 Season 1, episode 15 "My Brother, the Doctor" (1962), as Judy
 Season 3, episode 12 "Charlie Wade Makes Lots of Shade" (1963), as Sarah Oliver
 1963: The Alfred Hitchcock Hour
 Season 2, episode 1 "A Home Away from Home", as Ruth
 1963: Gunsmoke in "Police of the plain" (Gunsmoke or Marshal Dillon)
 Season 8, episode 33 "Quint-Cident", as Willa Devlin
 Season 9, episode 4 "Tobe", as Hanna
 1964: The Virginian
 Season 2, episode 20 "First to Thine Own Self", as Alma Reese
 1964: The F.B.I.
 Season 2, episode 5 "The Scourge", as Lyn Towner
 1967 to 1970: The Wonderful World of Disney
 Season 14, The Wonderful World of Disney (anthology series), episodes 11 and 12 "A Boy Called Nuthin", Parts I & II (1967), as Carrie Brackney
 Season 17, episodes 4 and 5 "The Wacky Zoo of Morgan City", Parts I & II (1970) by Marvin J. Chomsky, as Nancy Collins
 1976: The Streets of San Francisco
 Season 5, episode 4 "The Drop", as Alice Horvath

Television films 
 1974: The Family Kovack by Ralph Senensky: as Mrs. Linsen
 1976: Brinks: The Great Robbery by Marvin J. Chomsky: as Betty Houston

References
Citations

Bibliography

External links
 Mary LaRoche on IMDb
 Mary LaRoche on Internet Broadway Database
 Mary LaRoche on TV Guide
 

1920 births
1999 deaths
20th-century American actresses
20th-century American singers
American film actresses
American musical theatre actresses
American stage actresses
American television actresses
People from Rochester, New York
20th-century American women singers